Zengő Motorsport is a Hungarian motor racing team founded by Zoltán Zengő. They currently compete in the World Touring Car Cup and others TCR championships. The team also used to compete in the SEAT León Eurocup, where they won driver's titles in both 2009 and 2010, respectively.

World Touring Car Championship

SEAT León TDI (2010)
The team ran a SEAT León 2.0 TDI in their first WTCC season in 2010 for Norbert Michelisz under the Zengő–Dension Team banner. The team was not eligible for the Yokohama Independent's Trophy because of a protest from other teams just before the season opener, claiming that the team has substantial factory support from SEAT Sport. They scored a point in their first ever WTCC race when Michelisz finished race one of the Race of Brazil in tenth place. Michelisz started second behind Andy Priaulx on the race two reversed grid at the Race of Morocco but stalled his car at the start of the race and went on to finish tenth. He started second behind Priaulx again in race two of the Race of Belgium but a slow start meant he dropped to eighth on the opening lap, he recovered to sixth by the end of the race. Michelisz started on the front row of race two once again at the Race of Portugal and passed pole sitter Fredy Barth at the start. He remained in the lead until lap four when he was passed by Chevrolet RML driver Alain Menu. Michelisz eventually dropped out of the race with water pressure issues. Michelisz retired from race one of the Race of the Czech Republic after clashing with Colin Turkington after the early safety car, also taking out championship leader Yvan Muller. Michelisz finished eighth in the race one of the Race of Germany and therefore started on pole position for race two. He was soon passed at the start by Priaulx and then bumped by Monteiro and dropped further down the order. He had been running eighth when he was tapped by Robert Huff and dropped out of the points to eleventh where he finished the race. After the BMW Team RBM drivers were disqualified from the results of the Race of Japan, Michelisz was promoted to third place in race one to take the first podium result for Zengő Motorsport in the WTCC. Michelisz won the final race of the season at the Race of Macau. He finished the season 9th in the drivers' standings.

BMW 320 TC (2011–2012)

For the 2011 World Touring Car Championship season, the team switched cars to the BMW 320 TC and were eligible for the Yokohama Independent's Trophy. The team had to miss the season opening Race of Brazil as the team chose to test the new car before racing it. Michelisz lined up fourth at the Race of Italy as the fastest independent driver. He finished the first race of the weekend fourth having run third until the final lap when he demoted to fourth by Tiago Monteiro at the final corner. The team's best result came in the Race of Hungary, where Michelisz finished race one in second place. They could not repeat this in race two when Michelisz outbraked himself at the start trying to pass Kristian Poulsen, he finished fifteenth as the last classified runner. Having initially qualified fifth for the Race of the Czech Republic, Michelisz was excluded from the results after the team ran the car underweight during qualifying. After several near misses (Race of Germany, Race of Spain), Michelisz finished the season 9th in the overall points standings and 4th in the Yokohama Driver's Trophy. The team ended the season fourth in the Yokohama Teams' Trophy.

The team entered two BMW 320 TCs at the start of the 2012 season with Gábor Wéber joining Michelisz in the team. Previous title sponsor Dension pulled out of the WTCC, so the team changed their name back to Zengő Motorsport. Michelisz started on pole position for the second race at the Race of Italy and led until lap seven when he struck a pigeon on the track. After this, he started to drop down the order and finished eighth. Financial concerns meaning Wéber missed the Race of Morocco, reducing the team to running a single car for the event. Wéber returned at the Race of Slovakia, where Michelisz took both his and the team's first pole position in the WTCC, starting on the front row for race one alongside Aleksei Dudukalo. He finished sixth after making contact with Dudukalo's teammate Gabriele Tarquini at the start of the race. Zengő Motorsport and Michelisz took the race two victory at the Race of Hungary in front of their home crowd. The team was again reduced to a single car for the Race of Brazil as Wéber dropped out due to lack of a sponsorship. The Race of Brazil saw Michelisz move into the lead of the Yokohama Drivers' Trophy ahead of Pepe Oriola. A pair of podium finishes at the Race of the United States were to be the last overall championship points of the season for the team. Michelisz failed to score in the opening race of the Race of Japan and then spun out of the second race. Michelisz was given a drive through penalty for causing a second corner collision at the Race of China and finished fifteenth. Despite not finishing either race at the Race of Macau, Michelisz won the WTCC Yokohama Independent Drivers' Trophy. Zengő Motorsport finished fifth in the Yokohama Teams' Trophy, one place down on the previous season.

Honda Civic (2013–2017)
Zengő Motorsport stayed in the World Touring Car Championship in 2013, now running a Honda Civic 1.6T built by the works JAS Motorsport team. Norbert Michelisz stayed on as the team's sole driver.

In 2016 they added a 2nd car, and swapped out Michelisz for Ferenc Ficza and Dániel Nagy.

And in 2017 Ficaz was dropped as a driver, Aurélien Panis drove rounds 1–5 with Zsolt Szabó replacing him for rounds 6–10.

European Touring Car Cup
Zengő Motosport entered the European Touring Car Cup in 2013 with a pair of SEAT León Supercopas in the single–makes trophy for Ferenc Ficza and Norbert Nagy. The new Zengő Junior Team will be run jointly with MNASZ Track Racing.

World Touring Car Cup (2018 -) 
Zengő Motosport entered the inaugural season of the World Touring Car Cup (WTCR) in 2018 with a pair of CUPRA León TCR's.

In 2019 they were only a Wild Card entry and as such ineligible to score points.

In 2020 they were back as a full team now with 3 drivers and an upgraded car in the CUPRA León Competición TCR

In 2021 they created a 2nd junior team Zengő Motorsport Drivers’ Academy alongside the main team Zengő Motorsport Services KFT, each team had 2 drivers/cars.

In 2022 they were back to just 1 main 2 driver team.

Results

World Touring Car Championship

World Touring Car Cup

References

External links
 
 Profile at fiawtcc.com
 Team profile at michelisz.net

Hungarian auto racing teams
World Touring Car Championship teams
TCR International Series teams